Parnassius actius, also known as the scarce red apollo, is a high-altitude butterfly found in Central Asia. It is a member of the snow Apollo genus (Parnassius) of the swallowtail family (Papilionidae).

Range
Found in Turkmenistan, Uzbekistan, Tajikistan, Kyrgyzstan, north-eastern Afghanistan, Indus Valley (Pakistan) and (Jammu and Kashmir) and south-western China, including Xinjiang.

Description
Note: The wing pattern in Parnassius species is inconsistent and the very many subspecies and forms make identification problematic and uncertain. Structural characters derived from the genitalia, wing venation, sphragis and foretibial epiphysis are more, but not entirely reliable. The description given here is a guide only. For an identification key see P.R. Ackery (1975).

P. actius can be recognized by the more elongate and a little more pointed forewing. Ground colour usually pure white, more rarely slightly yellowish; vitreous margin of forewing narrow, as a rule not reaching the posterior angle, or the edge itself posteriorly narrowly white: submarginal spots feebly developed; in male usually only the anterior costal spot centred with red, in female both spots. The male, besides, somewhat duller, hindmarginal spot of forewing sometimes also marked with red, the submarginal markings more strongly developed. Hindwing grey at the base in both sexes, only in rare exceptional cases with a red basal spot above.

Status
It is a rare butterfly and declining due to changes in its habitat and is thus considered to be vulnerable. More information is needed on this species.

Gallery

See also
Papilionidae
List of butterflies of India
List of butterflies of India (Papilionidae)

References

 
 
 
 
 Sakai S., Inaoka S., Toshiaki A., Yamaguchi S., Watanabe Y., (2002) The Parnassiology. The Parnassius Butterflies, A Study in Evolution, Kodansha, Japan.
 Weiss J.-C., (2005) Parnassiinae of the World - Part 4, Hillside Books, Canterbury, UK.

Further reading
sv:Parnassius actius - Swedish Wikipedia provides further references and synonymy

External links
P. actius images at Consortium for the Barcode of Life
Parnassius actius
Parnassius gallery

actius
Insects of Afghanistan
Insects of Central Asia
Insects of Pakistan
Fauna of Jammu and Kashmir
Butterflies described in 1843